Ugo is the Italian form of Hugh, a widely used name of Germanic origin. Its diminutive form is Ugolino.

It is also a Nigerian Igbo first name.

It may refer to:

People

 Vgo (stonemason), medieval stonemason
 Ugo Bassi, a Roman Catholic priest and Italian nationalist
 Ugo Betti, Italian judge and author
 Ugo Boncompagni, birth name of Pope Gregory XIII
 Ugo Correani, Italian/German fashion designer
 Ugo da Carpi, Italian printmaker
 Ugo Ehiogu, English football player
 Ugo Fano, Italian physicist
 Ugo Gabrieli, Italian footballer
 Ugo Giachery, Italian Bahá'í
 Ugo Humbert, French tennis player
 Ugo La Malfa, an Italian politician
 Ugo Mattei, professor of international and comparative law at UC Hastings
 Ugo Monye, English international rugby union player 
 Ugo Mulas, Italian photographer
 Ugo Rondinone, Swiss-born artist
 Ugo Sansonetti, Italian businessman and athlete
 Ugo Tognazzi, Italian actor
 Ugo Zagato, Italian automobile designer

Other
 Ugo, Akita, a town in Japan
 Ugo Province, old Japanese province that is today Akita Prefecture
 Ugo (retailer), a chain of convenience stores in the United Kingdom
 UGO Networks, the entertainment portal website
 United Galactic Organization (Space Patrol (1962 TV series))

See also 
 Hugo (disambiguation)

Italian masculine given names
Italian names of Germanic origin